WKS may refer to:

 Wernicke–Korsakoff syndrome
 Wetterkurzschlüssel, German for Short Weather Cipher, a WWII codebook of the German Navy
 .wks (WorKSheet), a filename extension used by early Lotus 1-2-3 and Microsoft Works
 Well Known Services Domain name system record type; see List of DNS record types
 Wanamaker, Kempton and Southern Railroad, WK&S, a US railroad
 Fictional television station on the US Family Ties sitcom
 Wrocławski Klub Sportowy (Wrocław Sports Club) Śląsk Wrocław
 Wu Kai Sha station, Hong Kong; MTR station code